V. sinensis  may refer to:
 Vallaris sinensis, a synonym for Cryptolepis sinensis, a plant species
 Vespertilio sinensis, the Asian Parti-colored bat, a bat species found from Taiwan through eastern China and Siberia to the Korean Peninsula and Japan

See also
 Flora Sinensis